East Harwich is a census-designated place (CDP) and village in the town of Harwich in Barnstable County, Massachusetts, United States. The population was 4,872 at the 2010 census.

Geography
East Harwich is located at  (41.707881, -70.031345). It is bordered by the town of Brewster to the north and the town of Chatham to the southeast. Within the town of Harwich, the CDP of Northwest Harwich is to the west, across Long Pond Drive and Pleasant Lake Avenue (Massachusetts Route 124); Harwich Center is to the southwest, across Queen Anne Road and Chatham Road; and Harwich Port is to the south, across Chatham Road and Main Street (Massachusetts Route 28).

Demographics

As of the census of 2000, there were 4,744 people, 2,053 households, and 1,451 families residing in the CDP. The population density was 227.8/km2 (589.8/mi2). There were 2,943 housing units at an average density of 141.3/km2 (365.9/mi2). The racial makeup of the CDP was 96.65% White, 0.34% African American, 0.15% Native American, 0.38% Asian, 0.04% Pacific Islander, 1.08% from other races, and 1.37% from two or more races. Hispanic or Latino of any race were 0.93% of the population.

There were 2,053 households, out of which 23.1% had children under the age of 18 living with them, 58.9% were married couples living together, 9.0% had a female householder with no husband present, and 29.3% were non-families. 23.7% of all households were made up of individuals, and 13.0% had someone living alone who was 65 years of age or older. The average household size was 2.31 and the average family size was 2.71.

In the CDP, the population was spread out, with 19.4% under the age of 18, 3.7% from 18 to 24, 22.8% from 25 to 44, 27.2% from 45 to 64, and 26.9% who were 65 years of age or older. The median age was 48 years. For every 100 females, there were 92.0 males. For every 100 females age 18 and over, there were 87.7 males.

The median income for a household in the CDP was $46,777, and the median income for a family was $51,750. Males had a median income of $39,068 versus $26,977 for females. The per capita income for the CDP was $22,450. About 2.1% of families and 4.1% of the population were below the poverty line, including 8.3% of those under age 18 and none of those age 65 or over.

References

Harwich, Massachusetts
Census-designated places in Barnstable County, Massachusetts
Census-designated places in Massachusetts
Populated coastal places in Massachusetts